Persia International Bank plc commenced trading in London on 29 April 2002, following the merger of the London branches of Bank Mellat and Bank Tejarat, which are joint shareholders in Persia International Bank.

Sanctions and court actions
The United States Department of the Treasury mentioned Persia International in their 2008 watchlist of Iranian banks which may be trading in violation of UN Security Council Resolution 1803.

On 6 September 2013, the European General Court in Luxembourg ruled to annul the European Union sanctions in place since 2010 against the bank on grounds of supporting the Iranian nuclear and missile programs, as EU governments had incorrectly assessed the facts and evidence.

Notes

External links

Official Website

Banks of Iran
Banks of the United Kingdom
British companies established in 2002
Banks established in 2002